Ryan Spaulding (born September 10, 1998) is an American professional soccer player who currently plays as a defender for Major League Soccer club New England Revolution.

Background 
Spaulding was born in Cary, North Carolina. He attended Panther Creek High School in Cary. Spaulding played for the North Carolina FC Youth Academy.

Spaulding played two seasons of soccer at UNC Charlotte, appearing in 32 games and scoring three goals and two assists.

Career

North Carolina FC U23 
Spaulding played the 2017 USL Premier Development League season with North Carolina FC U23, leading the team in scoring with 5 goals.

Stade Briochin 
In January 2018, Spaudling joined Stade Briochin of France's Championnat National 2. He played nine games with the team.

North Carolina FC 
On September 20, 2019, Spaulding was signed by North Carolina FC of the USL Championship.

New England Revolution II 
On January 16, 2020, Spaulding was announced as part of the inaugural roster for New England Revolution II of USL League One.

New England Revolution
On February 18, 2022, Spaulding was signed to New England Revolution's MLS roster.

References

External links 
 
 

1998 births
Living people
American soccer players
Association football midfielders
Charlotte 49ers men's soccer players
North Carolina FC players
New England Revolution players
New England Revolution II players
People from Cary, North Carolina
Soccer players from North Carolina
Stade Briochin players
USL Championship players
American expatriate soccer players
Expatriate footballers in France
American expatriate sportspeople in France
USL League One players
Major League Soccer players
MLS Next Pro players
North Carolina FC U23 players
USL League Two players